The  Sumner County Slayings was a mass murder that occurred on or before April 27, 2019, when eight bodies were discovered at multiple locations in Sumner County, Tennessee. There was one sole survivor who was in critical condition but died in 2022 due to major health problems after the injuries. The case was the worst mass murder in Tennessee in 20 years.

Murders 
On April 17 a headless body was found (who was later identified as Jim Dunn) at a burned-out cabin. This was just the start of the massacre which took place 10 days later when police responded to multiple crime scenes finding four members of Cummins family slayed in their home at Charles Brown Road, including his mother, father, and his uncle along with his uncle's girlfriend and two members of the girlfriend's family. They discovered another deceased victim on Luby Brown Road. Two more victims were discovered the next day and a victim who survived her wounds. One of the deceased victims was a 12-year-old girl who was partially nude but no sexual assault occurred. All the victim deaths were caused by blunt force trauma to the head.

Arrest of Cummins 
Cummins was going to be arrested in the upcoming days before the bodies were found due to a violation of probation of not having a mental health evaluation. A warrant was in the works. After the murders, Cummins was a suspect due to not being seen and his family's untimely deaths. Cummins was later spotted and shot after he was cornered near a creek by multiple police officers. However, his trial was delayed many time due to COVID. On June 9, 2022, he was found fit to stand trial. His trial will start April 2023.

References 

April 2019 crimes in the United States
Mass murder in 2019
April 2019 events in the United States
Mass murder in the United States
Murder in Tennessee
Family murders